Typopeltis is an Asian genus of whip scorpions or 'vinegaroons' and currently the only member of subfamily Typopeltinae.

Species
, the World Uropygi Catalog accepts the following thirteen species:
 Typopeltis cantonensis Speijer, 1936 – China
 Typopeltis crucifer Pocock, 1894 – Japan, Taiwan
 Typopeltis dalyi Pocock, 1900 – Thailand
 Typopeltis guangxiensis Haupt & Song, 1996 – China
 Typopeltis harmandi Kraepelin, 1900 – Vietnam
 Typopeltis kasnakowi Tarnani, 1900 – Thailand
 Typopeltis laurentianus Seraphim, Giupponi & Miranda, 2019 – Vietnam
 Typopeltis magnificus Haupt, 2004 – Laos
 Typopeltis niger (Tarnani, 1894) – China
 Typopeltis soidaoensis Haupt, 1996 – Thailand, Vietnam
 Typopeltis stimpsonii (Wood, 1862) – Japan
 Typopeltis tarnanii Pocock, 1902 – Thailand
 Typopeltis vanoorti (Speijer, 1936) – China

References

External Links & See Also
 List of Thelyphonidae species (includes fossil taxa)
 

Arachnid genera
Uropygi
Arachnids of Asia